Limon Bay (Bahía Limón in the original Spanish) is a natural harbor located at the north end of the Panama Canal, west of the cities of Cristóbal and Colón. Ships waiting to enter the canal stay here, protected from storms by breakwaters.

Bays of Panama
Colón Province